The 1994 Liwa earthquake occurred on . It was located in southern Sumatra, Indonesia. The magnitude of the earthquake was put at  6.9, 7.0, or  7.2, according to different sources.

The earthquake caused 207 deaths and 2000 injuries. There was damage from landslides, mudslides, and fires in Lampung Province. Power outage occurred in western Lampung. Six-thousand buildings were damaged or destroyed by landslides in the Liwa area. In addition to southern Sumatra, the earthquake could be felt in western Java and Singapore. Intense smoke and gas activity was observed in the Suwoh volcanic area.

The earthquake took place at the Sumatran Fault Zone. The Sumatran Fault Zone is 1,900 km long and highly segmented. It can be divided into about 20 segments. The earthquake occurred in a subparallel strand 2.5 km southwest of the principal trace of the Kumering segment. The focal mechanism is of right-lateral strike-slip faulting.

See also 
 1933 Sumatra earthquake
 List of earthquakes in 1994
 List of earthquakes in Indonesia

References

External links 

1994 in Indonesia
Earthquakes in Sumatra
Earthquakes in Indonesia
History of Sumatra
History of Lampung
Lampung
West Lampung Regency
Liwa earthquake, 1994
February 1994 events in Asia
1995 disasters in Indonesia